Amanda Wenban is an actress who has worked in television in both the United Kingdom and Australia.

Her credits include: Inspector Morse, A Bit of a Do, Families, Home and Away, Revelations, All Saints and Farscape: The Peacekeeper Wars.

She was a regular cast member on the soap opera Emmerdale, playing Angharad McAllister in the series from 1993 to 1995.

External links
 

British television actresses
Australian television actresses
Living people
Year of birth missing (living people)